The 1952 Green Bay Packers season was their 34th season overall and their 32nd season in the National Football League. The team finished with a 6–6 record under third-year head coach Gene Ronzani for a fourth-place finish in the National Conference in 1952. After climbing to a 6–3 record, the Packers lost their final three games, but the .500 record was their best since 1947.

The Packers played their Milwaukee home games in Marquette Stadium during this season only, after using Wisconsin State Fair Park from 1934 through 1951. The new County Stadium became the venue in 1953, and hosted the Milwaukee home games through 1994, when they were discontinued.

Head coach Ronzani was a Marquette University alumnus (1933) and won nine varsity letters in college.

Offseason

NFL draft 

 Yellow indicates a future Pro Bowl selection

Regular season

Schedule 

Note: Intra-conference opponents are in bold text.

Game summaries

Week 7

Standings

Roster

Awards, records, and honors

References 

 Sportsencyclopedia.com

Green Bay Packers seasons
Green Bay Packers
Green Bay Packers